Futrell is a surname. Notable people with the surname include:

Mike Futrell (born 1960), American attorney and former Louisiana state representative
Junius Marion Futrell (1870–1955), Arkansas politician
Bobby Futrell (1962–1992), American football player
Mynga Futrell, American activist